Kannemeyeria is a genus of dicynodont that lived during the Anisian age of Middle Triassic period in what is now Africa and South America. The generic name is given in honor of Dr. Daniel Rossouw Kannemeyer, the South African fossil collector who discovered the original specimen. It is one of the first representatives of the family, and hence one of the first large herbivores of the Triassic.

Description 

Although it had a large head, it was lightweight due to the size of the eye sockets and nasal cavity. It also had limb girdles which formed massive plates of bone that helped support its heavily built body.

Kannemeyeria was well-adapted to living as a herbivore; it had a powerful beak and strong jaw muscles built for shearing plant material. Kannemeyeria had a massive head with unusually large openings for the eyes, nostrils and jaw muscles. It evidently tore up roots, stripped leaves from the vegetation with its horny break and ground them up with its toothless jaws.

In a zone of Karoo Supergroup, Kannemeyeria is found alongside large carnivorous archosaur Erythrosuchus.

Distribution 

Kannemeyeria is known from the Subzone B of Burgersdorp Formation of South Africa, the Ntawere Formation of Zambia, the Omingonde Formation of Namibia, the Lifua member of Manda Formation of Tanzania, and the Quebrada de los Fósiles Formation of Argentina.

Classification 

Below is a cladogram from Kammerer et al. (2013):

See also 

 List of therapsids

References 

Middle Triassic synapsids of South America
Triassic Argentina
Fossils of Argentina
Kannemeyeriiformes
Anomodont genera
Fossils of Russia
Early Triassic synapsids of Africa
Triassic Namibia
Fossils of Namibia
Omingonde Formation
Triassic South Africa
Fossils of South Africa
Triassic Tanzania
Fossils of Tanzania
Fossils of Zambia
Fossil taxa described in 1908
Taxa named by Harry Seeley